Kari Buen (born 23 January 1938 at Kongsberg) is a Norwegian sculptor.

Buen belongs to the artist family Buen from Jondalen, and is the daughter of the fiddler Anders A. Buen and the traditional musician Margit Buen. She is the sister of the musicians Hauk Buen, Knut Buen and Agnes Buen Garnås. She is particularly known for her work with reliefs, sculptures, wood carving work and drawings.

Buen studied at the Art School in Trondheim under Karl Johan Flåthen 1958–1960, at the Norwegian National Academy of Fine Arts in Oslo under Per Palle Storm and Roar Wold 1963-66 and 1973–74, and at Rauland Academy under Knut Skinnarland 1978 to 1979. Buen debuted at the Autumn Exhibition in Oslo in 1960.

References

1938 births
Living people
20th-century Norwegian women artists
Norwegian sculptors
Norwegian women sculptors
Norwegian women artists
People from Kongsberg